Delhi Public School, Rourkela, (or DPS Rourkela) is an Indian school in the district of Sundergarh, Odisha, Sector-14, Rourkela, Odisha. The school is run by the Delhi Public School Society (DPS Society). Mr. R Mishra  is the Chairman of this school.

History

Courses
 The school has 3,300 students from kindergarten (nursery), classes I to XII, with science, commerce and humanities at the senior secondary level

See also 

 List of schools in Odisha

References

External links 

 
 Delhi Public School Society
 DPS Rourkela in Google Map

Delhi Public School Society
Primary schools in India
High schools and secondary schools in Odisha
Schools in Rourkela
Educational institutions established in 1992
1992 establishments in Orissa